"Panic Switch" is a song by the American alternative rock band Silversun Pickups. It was the first single released from the group's second album, Swoon (2009), on March 17, 2009. The song reached number one on the Billboard Alternative Songs chart, becoming their first number-one single on any Billboard chart. "Panic Switch" was the first song by an independent artist to reach number one on the chart in 11 years. After a one-week stay at number one, it spent 11 weeks at number two behind Linkin Park's "New Divide".  It is also their first Hot 100 entry, peaking at number 92.

Background
When asked about the song, singer Brian Aubert told MTV that the song was added late to the album, almost as an afterthought. It is meant to represent a nervous breakdown, which is a major theme of the album.

Reception
The song was ranked at no. 45 on Consequence of Sound'''s Every Alternative Rock No. 1 Hit from Worst to Best.

Use in other media
The song appeared in the trailer for Sucker Punch'' and in the Honda Stage video package during the 2016 NHL Winter Classic.

In 2012, Mitt Romney's presidential campaign received a cease and desist request from Silversun Pickups, who alleged illegal use of their song at a campaign event set-up in North Carolina. Romney's spokeswoman, Amanda Henneberg, stated that playing the song before the event began was covered under the campaign's regular blanket license and would not play it again.

It is featured in Fortnite's Rock & Royale radio station in-game.

Chart performance

Weekly charts

Year-end charts

Certifications

References

2009 singles
Silversun Pickups songs
2009 songs
Dangerbird Records singles